Paras Arora is an Indian actor who works in Hindi-language television shows and Bollywood films. He is best known for portraying the character of Chhatrapati Shivaji Maharaj in Veer Shivaji, Abhimanyu in Mahabharat and Vivaan Rajvanshi in Udann Sapnon Ki.

He is currently playing the role of Veer Malhotra in Dil Diyaan Gallan.

Filmography

Films

Television

Music videos

References

External links 

Male actors from Uttar Pradesh
Living people
Punjabi people
1994 births
People from Bareilly
21st-century Indian male actors
Male actors in Hindi television